Carlos Silvestre Frenk  (born 27 October 1951) is a Mexican-British cosmologist and the Ogden Professor of Fundamental Physics at Durham University. His main interests lie in the fields of cosmology, galaxy formation and computer simulations of cosmic structure formation.

Early life and education
Carlos Frenk was born in Mexico City, Mexico and is the eldest son of six siblings. His father is a German Jewish doctor who emigrated from Germany at the age of 7, fleeing persecution in the lead up to World War II. His mother is a Mexican–Spanish pianist.

Frenk studied engineering at the National Autonomous University of Mexico but later changed to Theoretical Physics, earning an undergraduate degree in 1976. Later that year he secured a British Council Fellowship and enrolled at the University of Cambridge to read Part III of the Mathematical Tripos, which he was awarded in 1977. He remained at Cambridge for doctoral studies under the supervision of Bernard J. T. Jones and was awarded a PhD in astronomy in 1981.

Career and research
Following an endowment from Peter Ogden in 2001, Frenk became the inaugural Ogden Professor of Fundamental Physics at Durham University and continues to hold this position today. He is also co-Principal Investigator of the Virgo Consortium, alongside Simon White. Frenk became the Director of the Institute for Computational Cosmology when it was established in 2001. He held this post until 2020 when he was succeeded by Shaun Cole.

Awards and honours
He was elected a Fellow of the Royal Society (FRS) in 2004 and is a member of the Royal Society's Council. He won the Gold Medal of the Royal Astronomical Society in 2014. Other awards and honours include:

2021 Rumford Medal
2020 Dirac Medal and Prize, Institute of Physics
2020 Clarivate Citation Laureate in Physics
2017 Max Born Prize of the German Physical Society
2014 Gold medal of the Royal Astronomical Society 
2013 Alexander von Humboldt Research Award
2013 Lansdowne Visitor, University of Victoria, Canada
2013 The Biermann Lectures, Max Planck Society
2011 Gruber Prize in Cosmology ($500,000, jointly with Marc Davis, George Efstathiou, Simon White) 
2010 Fred Hoyle Medal and Prize, Institute of Physics 
2010 George Darwin Lectureship, Royal Astronomical Society
2007 Daniel Chalonge medal, Observatoire de Paris 
2006 Royal Society Wolfson Research Merit Award
2006 The Withrow lecture, Royal Astronomical Society
2004 Elected a Fellow of the Royal Society (FRS)
2004 Ranked 2nd most cited author in Space Sciences in the world in the past 10 years.
2002 Ranked 5th most cited physical scientist in UK since 1980
2000–2001 Leverhulme Research Fellowship
2000 Ranked 16th most cited physical scientist in the UK during the 1990s
1996–1999 PPARC Senior Fellowship
1992–1993 Sir Derman Christopherson Fellowship, University of Durham
1991–1992 Nuffield Foundation Science Research Fellowship
1985 SERC Advanced Fellowship (declined)
1976–1979 British Council Fellowship
1976 Gabino Barreda medal for first place in Theor. Phys. degree

Frenk was appointed Commander of the Order of the British Empire (CBE) in the 2017 Birthday Honours for services to cosmology and the public dissemination of basic science. He was interviewed by Kirsty Young for Desert Island Discs, first broadcast in 2018.

References

Citations

Sources

External links 
 

1951 births
Living people
20th-century Mexican physicists
21st-century British physicists
British cosmologists
Academics of Durham University
Alumni of King's College, Cambridge
Fellows of the Royal Society
National Autonomous University of Mexico alumni
Recipients of the Gold Medal of the Royal Astronomical Society
Scientists from Mexico City
Commanders of the Order of the British Empire